Ja'Len Embry (born March 14, 1996) is an American football defensive back for the Raiders Tirol. He also played college football at Iowa, Iowa Central CC and Northern Illinois.

Early life and high school career
Embry began his football career at the age of ten with the Detroit Northwest Lions, and went on to play for the Oak Park Trojans and the Detroit Dolphins. He attended Martin Luther King Jr. Senior High School in Detroit, where he initially played baseball and track. He did not think he could compete in football at the high school level. It was not until his junior year that he joined the Crusaders football team, along with future NFL athlete Avonte Maddox, at defensive back and wide receiver. Embry was an immediate contributor on both sides of the ball for his team, which won the city championship in 2012. He was selected to the all-city team as well as the all-state second team. As a senior in 2013, he was named a first-team all-state selection as well as first-team all-metro and all-city.

College career
In 2014, he committed to the University of Iowa as a three-star recruit, where he redshirted his freshman year with the Hawkeyes. In 2015, he transferred to Iowa Central Community College. For the Tritons, he recorded 49 tackles and one interception in ten games. For the 2016 season, Embry was recruited by Northern Illinois University. After sitting out his first season with the Huskies, he appeared in every game at cornerback and on special teams in 2017. In his senior year, Embry was a regular. He recorded 60 tackles and eight pass break-ups, helping his team to the conference title.

Professional career

Embry was not invited to the NFL Combine and instead participated in the Northern Illinois Pro Day.

North America
In the spring of 2019, Embry received an invitation to the Houston Texans' rookie mini-camp, but was subsequently not signed to a contract. In 2020, he was signed by the Aviators of The Spring League, a scouting and developmental league. He lost to the Generals in the finals with the Aviators. Embry returned to the Aviators for the 2021 season.

In the 2022 USFL Draft, Embry was selected as the 28th cornerback in the eleventh round by the New Orleans Breakers. Embry struggled with injuries and was released after the first day of play on April 19.

Europe
In June 2022, Embry was signed by the Frankfurt Galaxy before the second week of play in the European League of Football (ELF). Embry was considered there as a slot corner. He played frequently as a safety with the Galaxy and led his team with a total of four interceptions. With a record of eight wins to four losses, Galaxy finished third in the Central Conference and missed the playoffs.

In December 2022, the Raiders Tirol announced the signing of Embry for the 2023 ELF season.

Professional statistics

References

External links
 Northern Illinois Huskies bio
 njcaa.org
 European League of Football bio

1994 births
Living people
Players of American football from Detroit
American football cornerbacks
American football safeties
Iowa Hawkeyes football players
Houston Texans players
Iowa Central Tritons football players
Northern Illinois Huskies football players
European League of Football players
The Spring League players
New Orleans Breakers (2022) players
Frankfurt Galaxy (ELF) players
American expatriate players of American football
American expatriate sportspeople in Germany
American expatriate sportspeople in Austria